The National Natural Landmarks in Alaska include 16 of the almost 600 National Natural Landmarks (NNLs) in the United States. They cover areas of geological and biological importance, and include craters, volcanoes, glaciers, lakes, islands and habitats for several rare species. The first set of five designations was made in 1967, while the most recent were made when two new sites were designated in 1976. Six landmarks are found within the Unorganized Borough, while the rest are located in organized boroughs; Aleutians East Borough holds the most, with four. Owners include private individuals and several state and federal agencies.

The National Natural Landmarks Program is administered by the National Park Service, a branch of the Department of the Interior. The National Park Service determines which properties meet NNL criteria and, after notifying the owners, makes nomination recommendations. The Secretary of the Interior reviews nominations and, based on a set of predetermined criteria, makes a decision on NNL designation or a determination of eligibility for designation. Both public and privately owned properties can be designated as NNLs. Owners may object to the nomination of the property as a NNL. This designation provides indirect, partial protection of the historic integrity of the properties via tax incentives, grants, monitoring of threats, and other means.

National Natural Landmarks

References
 General
 

Specific

External links
 National Natural Landmarks Program

Alaska geography-related lists
Alaska